Lahijan (also Romanized as Lāhījān) is a village in Lahijan Rural District of Khosrowshah District, Tabriz County, East Azerbaijan province, Iran. At the 2006 National Census, its population was 3,714 in 971 households. The following census in 2011 counted 4,701 people in 1,364 households. The latest census in 2016 showed a population of 5,430 people in 1,663 households; it was the largest village in its rural district.

References 

Tabriz County

Populated places in East Azerbaijan Province

Populated places in Tabriz County